Essays and Reviews, edited by John William Parker, published in March 1860, is a broad-church volume of seven essays on Christianity. The topics covered the biblical research of the German critics, the evidence for Christianity, religious thought in England, and the cosmology of Genesis.

Essays and Reviews was a popular book title in the 19th century: there are many similar books available, but none made the same impact.

Background
Each essay was authored independently by one of six Church of England churchmen and one layman. There was no overall editorial policy and each contributor chose his own theme. The six church essayists were: Frederick Temple, who later became Archbishop of Canterbury; Rowland Williams, then tutor at Cambridge and later Professor and Vice-Principal of St David's University College, Lampeter; Baden Powell, clergyman and Professor of Geometry at Oxford; Henry Bristow Wilson, fellow of St John's College, Oxford; Mark Pattison, tutor at Lincoln College, Oxford; and Benjamin Jowett, Fellow of Balliol College, Oxford (later Master) and Regius Professor of Greek, Oxford University.  The layman was Charles Wycliffe Goodwin, former fellow of St Catharine's College, Cambridge, Egyptologist, barrister and, later, Assistant Judge of the British Supreme Court for China and Japan.

Significance 
The book was important because of its date and its authors. Appearing four months after Charles Darwin's On the Origin of Species, it summed up a three-quarter-century-long challenge to biblical history by the higher critics and to biblical prehistory by scientists working in the new fields of geology and biology. Baden Powell restated his argument that God is a lawgiver, miracles break the lawful edicts issued at the creation, therefore belief in miracles is atheistic, and wrote of "Mr Darwin's masterly volume" that the Origin of Species "must soon bring about an entire revolution in opinion in favour of the grand principle of the self-evolving powers of nature."

"Outwardly, the conflict ended inconclusively, with the acquittal of Williams and Wilson by the courts and the condemnation of
the volume by the clergy in Convocation. At a deeper level, it marked the exhaustion both of the Broad Church and of Anglican orthodoxy and the commencement of an era of religious doubt."

Seven articles 

 The Education of the World by Frederick Temple—"a warmed-over sermon urging the free study of the Bible"
 Bunsen's Biblical Researches by Rowland Williams—"denying the predictive character of Old Testament prophecies"
 On the Study of the Evidences of Christianity by Baden Powell—"flatly denied the possibility of miracles"
 Séances Historiques de Genève. The National Church by Henry Bristow Wilson—"gave the widest possible latitude to the Thirty-nine Articles and questioned the eternity of damnation"
 On the Mosaic Cosmogony by C. W. Goodwin—"a critique of the attempted 'Harmonies' between Genesis and geology"
 Tendencies of Religious Thought in England, 1688-1750 by Mark Pattison—"a learned and cold study of the evidential theologians of the eighteenth century"
 On the Interpretation of Scripture by Benjamin Jowett—"in which he urged that the Bible be read 'like any other book' and made an impassioned plea for freedom of scholarship"

"On the interpretation of scripture" 

The essay "On the interpretation of scripture" was contributed by Benjamin Jowett. When asked to contribute, Jowett saw the opportunity to challenge traditionalists. He was a rationalist and insisted that the Bible ought to be treated as scholars treated classical texts. Jowett was a proponent of progressive revelation in which the laterb books  were seen to be closer to the ultimate revelation of God as seen in Jesus Christ as revealed in the Gospels. The epistles and other New Testament writings were seen to look back.

The implications of Jowett's essay and his other writings that revelation was ongoing and that scripture was always subject to reinterpretation as each generation encountered them were the target of his traditionalist foes. Jowett felt he was being slandered for his honesty concerning his beliefs, but he suffered no actual penalty other than an infamously low salary at Christ Church, Oxford. However, in 1863 Jowett was brought before the vice-chancellor's court for teaching contrary to the doctrines of the Church of England; the case was eventually dropped.

Reception 

Hardly known outside academic theological circles today, Essays sold 22,000 copies in two years, more than Origin sold in its first twenty years. It sparked five years of increasingly polarized debate with books and pamphlets furiously contesting the issues.

A review by Frederic Harrison published in the Westminster Review in October 1860 had the probably undesired effect of stimulating the attack on the book. Harrison saw the essays as neither religious nor rational which was a double blow to the seven who saw the essays as promoting rational religion.

In January 1861, an anonymous review was published in the Quarterly Review. The author was later revealed as Samuel Wilberforce, the Bishop of Oxford. The Quarterly review was followed up by a letter to The Times co-signed by the Archbishop of Canterbury and 25 bishops which threatened the theologians with the ecclesiastical courts. Darwin quoted a proverb: "A bench of bishops is the devil's flower garden", and joined others including the eminent geologist Charles Lyell, and the mathematician and Queen's printer William Spottiswoode,  in signing a counter-letter supporting Essays and Reviews for trying to "establish religious teachings on a firmer and broader foundation".

On the subject Lewis Carroll wrote, "Let E = Essays, and R = Reviews: then the locus of (E + R), referred to multilinear coordinates, will be found to be a superficies (i.e., a locus possessing length and breadth, but no depth)."

Repercussions 

Despite this alignment of pro-evolution scientists and Unitarians with liberal churchmen, Williams and Wilson were charged with heresy in the Court of Arches. They were found guilty on some of the counts by the Dean of Arches, Stephen Lushington, but appealed to the Judicial Committee of the Privy Council. The Judicial Committee comprised secular judges sitting with the Archbishop of Canterbury, the Archbishop of York and the Bishop of London. In 1864 it overturned the convictions, with the Archbishops of Canterbury and York dissenting in part (though the Bishop of London concurred in the decision). It was said that the Privy Council had "dismissed hell with costs". One hundred and thirty-seven thousand laity signed a letter of thanks to the Archbishops of Canterbury and York for voting against the Committee, and a declaration in favour of biblical inspiration and eternal torments was drawn up at Oxford and circulated to the 24,800 clergy, being signed by eleven thousand of them. Wilberforce went to the Convocation of Canterbury and in June obtained "synodical condemnation" of Essays and Reviews.

Today the essay topics and conclusions may seem innocuous, but at the time, the essays were described by their opponents as heretical, and the essayists were called "The Seven Against Christ."....

See also

 Anglicanism
 Church of England
 Liberal Christianity

Notes

References

 Published anonymously.

 Also available from Google-books.
 Published anonymously.

Further reading 

1860 books
Anglicanism
History of the Church of England
Books about religion and science